Conor Mahony is an Irish former rugby union player.

Career
Mahony played for amateur side Cork Constitution in the All-Ireland League, and was a Munster squad member alongside brother Cian, making at least twenty five appearances for the province during his career their. In 2002, work commitments took Mahony to Dublin, where he joined Clontarf.

References

External links
Munster Profile

Living people
1974 births
Rugby union players from County Cork
Irish rugby union players
Cork Constitution players
Clontarf FC players
Munster Rugby players
Rugby union centres